William Joseph Denison (12 May 1769 – 2 August 1849), son of Joseph Denison (c.1726 – 1806), was an English banker, politician, landowner, and philanthropist.

Life

William was born in Princes Street, Lothbury, the only son of Joseph Denison (1726?–1806), who had gone to London from the west of Yorkshire at an early age and amassed a fortune.

William was a highly successful banker and became a senior partner in the firm of Denison, Heywood, & Kennard (based in Lombard Street, London).

Upon the death of his father in 1806, Denison acquired estates in Yorkshire (Seamer, south of Scarborough) and Surrey (Denbies, near Dorking). During the course of his lifetime, he extended the boundaries of the latter considerably, through the purchase of adjoining land from both the Duke of Norfolk and Earl of Verulam. Denison also increased the size of his financial inheritance to such an extent that, following his death in Pall Mall, London on 2 August 1849, the gross value of his estate was an estimated £2,300,000 (equivalent to around £184 million ). He was selected High Sheriff of Yorkshire for 1808/09. Having never married, virtually all of his estate passed to his nephew Lord Albert Conyngham, on condition that he took the surname Denison.

According to the records of The General Cemetery Company (incorporated by Act of Parliament 1832), Denison is buried in plot 8304 at Kensal Green Cemetery.

Notes

References

External links
 historyofparliamentonline.org, Denison, William Joseph (1770–1849), of Denbies, nr. Dorking, Surr.

Attribution

1770 births
1849 deaths
English bankers
English landowners
Members of the Parliament of Great Britain for English constituencies
British MPs 1796–1800
Members of the Parliament of the United Kingdom for English constituencies
UK MPs 1801–1802
UK MPs 1806–1807
UK MPs 1818–1820
UK MPs 1820–1826
UK MPs 1826–1830
UK MPs 1830–1831
UK MPs 1831–1832
UK MPs 1832–1835
UK MPs 1835–1837
UK MPs 1837–1841
UK MPs 1841–1847
UK MPs 1847–1852
Whig (British political party) MPs for English constituencies
19th-century English landowners
High Sheriffs of Yorkshire